Robert Green (5 January 1911 – 8 May 1949) was an Australian rules footballer who played with Carlton in the VFL for 13 seasons, from 1933 to 1945 (inclusive).

Football
The younger brother of Carlton player Jack Green, Bob was a wingman in Carlton's 1938 premiership side.

Death
Green died on 8 May 1949 in Preston, Victoria, when he was hit by a car at a tram stop. He was 38.

Footnotes

References

External links

Profile at Blueseum

1911 births
1949 deaths
Players of Australian handball
Australian rules footballers from Victoria (Australia)
Carlton Football Club players
Carlton Football Club Premiership players
One-time VFL/AFL Premiership players
Road incident deaths in Victoria (Australia)